The Church of Jesus Christ of Latter-day Saints in Wisconsin refers to the Church of Jesus Christ of Latter-day Saints (LDS Church) and its members in Wisconsin. The official church membership as a percentage of general population was 0.44% in 2014. According to the 2014 Pew Forum on Religion & Public Life survey, less than 1% of Wisconsinites self-identify themselves most closely with The Church of Jesus Christ of Latter-day Saints. The LDS Church is the 10th largest denomination in Wisconsin.

History

After the LDS Church left nearby Nauvoo, Illinois in 1844 for the West, missionary efforts resumed in the state in 1878, with a congregation formed in 1899, and a chapel built in 1907.

James Strang, a man who had been baptized four months before the martyrdom of Joseph, had stepped forward to become the new leader of the LDS Church, but was subsequently excommunicated and later established a new church, the Church of Jesus Christ of Latter Day Saints (Strangite), with followers who gathered to Voree, Wisconsin.

On April 16, 1899, the Milwaukee Branch, the first formal organization of the Church in the city, was founded in Wisconsin.

In 2012, the LDS Church presence in Wisconsin was 24,386 members, about 0.4 percent of the state population.

Stakes

As of February 2023, the following stakes ware located in Wisconsin:

 *Stakes outside of state with congregations in Wisconsin

Mission
 Wisconsin Milwaukee Mission

Temples
Wisconsin is located within the Chicago Illinois Temple and the St. Paul Minnesota Temple districts.

See also

The Church of Jesus Christ of Latter-day Saints membership statistics (United States)
Religion in Wisconsin

References

External links
 Newsroom (Wisconsin)
 ComeUntoChrist.org Latter-day Saints Visitor site
 The Church of Jesus Christ of Latter-day Saints Official site

Latter Day Saint movement in Wisconsin
Wisconsin